Eduardo Junqueira Sales also known as Edu Sales (born 13 December 1977 in São Paulo) is a former Brazilian football player who played as midfielder.

External links
 Player profile  
 
 

1977 births
Living people
Brazilian footballers
Brazilian expatriate footballers
US Créteil-Lusitanos players
C.D. Nacional players
Associação Desportiva São Caetano players
Coritiba Foot Ball Club players
Jeonbuk Hyundai Motors players
União São João Esporte Clube players
Figueirense FC players
Ceará Sporting Club players
Esporte Clube Vitória players
Ligue 2 players
K League 1 players
Primeira Liga players
Super League Greece players
Brazilian expatriate sportspeople in South Korea
Expatriate footballers in South Korea
Expatriate footballers in France
Expatriate footballers in Portugal
Expatriate footballers in Greece
Association football midfielders
Brazilian expatriate sportspeople in France
Brazilian expatriate sportspeople in Greece
Brazilian expatriate sportspeople in Portugal
Footballers from São Paulo